Bobby Jones Gospel (sometimes called The Bobby Jones Gospel Hour) is a program on Black Entertainment Television hosted by Dr. Bobby Jones. The series premiered on Sunday, January 27, 1980, two days after the network's January 25 launch. Bobby Jones Gospel features performances by gospel music artists. , the series is BET's longest running. On April 27, 2015 it was announced the show would be coming to an end after 35 years. The finale aired July 31, 2016.

References

External links 
 
Bobby Jones Gospel on BET.com

Bobby Jones
Bobby Jones
Bobby Jones
Bobby Jones
Bobby Jones
Bobby Jones
Bobby Jones
Bobby Jones